The Explanatory Dictionary of the Georgian Language is one of the major explanatory dictionaries of the Georgian language. It consists of eight volumes and contains nearly 115,000 words. The editor in chief was Arnold Chikobava. It was produced since 1950 until 1964, and about 150 scientists worked on it. It was the first Georgian dictionary which had a systematic documentation for each word. The words are arranged alphabetically. The first volume contains a brief description of the grammar of Georgian.

See also
 Georgian language

References

External links
 Online version of the dictionary

Georgian dictionaries
1950 non-fiction books